The 2017 Men's World Team Squash Championships was the men's edition of the 2017, which serves as the world team championship for squash players. The event was held in Marseille, France, from November 26 to December 3, 2017. The tournament is organized by the World Squash Federation and the French Squash Federation.

The Egyptian team won their fourth World Team Championships after beating England in the final.

Since there was no 3rd-place match, Hong Kong and Australia both shared the bronze medal.

Participating Teams 
A total of 24 teams competed from all the five confederations: Africa, America, Asia, Europe and Oceania. For Jamaica, it was their first participation at a world team championship.

Seeds

Squads 

  Argentina
 Leandro Romiglio
 Juan Pablo Roude
 Roberto Pezzota
 Rodrigo Obegron

  Australia
 Ryan Cuskelly
 Cameron Pilley
 Rex Hedrick
 Zac Alexander

  Austria
 Aqeel Rehman
 Jakob Dirnberger
 Paul Mairinger
 Lukas Windischberger

  Canada
 Nick Sachvie
 Andrew Schnell
 Shawn Delierre
 Mike McCue

  Czech Republic
 Daniel Mekbib
 Jakub Solnický
 Martin Švec
 Ondřej Uherka

  Egypt
 Karim Abdel Gawad
 Ali Farag
 Marwan ElShorbagy
 Ramy Ashour

  England
 Nick Matthew
 James Willstrop
 Daryl Selby
 Adrian Waller

  Finland
 Olli Tuominen
 Matias Tuomi
 Miko Äijänen
 Jami Äijänen

  France
 Grégory Gaultier
 Grégoire Marche
 Mathieu Castagnet
 Lucas Serme

  Germany
 Simon Rösner
 Raphael Kandra
 Valentin Rapp
 Rudi Rohrmüller

  Hong Kong
 Max Lee
 Leo Au
 Yip Tsz Fung
 Tang Ming Hong

  India
 Saurav Ghosal
 Harinder Pal Sandhu
 Vikram Malhotra
 Mahesh Mangaonkar

  Iraq
 Mohamed Hasan
 Rasool Al-Sultani
 Hasanain Dakheel
 Husham Al-Saadi

  Ireland
 Arthur Gaskin
 Drian Byrne
 Sean Conroy
 Conor O'Hare

  Jamaica
 Chris Binnie
 Bruce Burrowes
 Lewis Walters
 Dane Schwier

  Malaysia
 Mohamad Nafiizwan Adnan
 Ng Eain Yow
 Mohammad Syafiq Kamal
 Muhammad Addeen Idrakie

  New Zealand
 Paul Coll
 Campbell Grayson
 Evan Williams
 Ben Grindrod

  Pakistan
 Farhan Zaman
 Amaad Fareed
 Muhammad Asim Khan
 Shahjahan Khan

  Scotland
 Alan Clyne
 Greg Lobban
 Douglas Kempsell
 Kevin Moran

  South Africa
 Thoboki Mohohlo
 Christo Potgieter
 Rodney Durbach
 Gary Wheadon

  Spain
 Borja Golán
 Carlos Cornes
 Iker Pajares
 Bernat Jaume

  Switzerland
 Nicolas Mueller
 Dimitri Steinmann
 Reiko Peter
 Roman Allinckx

  United States
 Chris Gordon
 Chris Hanson
 Todd Harrity
 Faraz Khan

  Wales
 Peter Creed
 David Haley
 Joel Makin
 Emyr Evans

Group stage

Pool A 

November 27, 2017

November 28, 2017

November 29, 2017

Pool B 

November 27, 2017

November 28, 2017

November 29, 2017

Pool C 

November 27, 2017

November 28, 2017

November 29, 2017

Pool D 

November 27, 2017

November 28, 2017

November 29, 2017

Pool E 

November 27, 2017

November 28, 2017

November 29, 2017

Pool F 

November 27, 2017

November 28, 2017

November 29, 2017

Pool G 

November 27, 2017

November 28, 2017

November 29, 2017

Pool H 

November 27, 2017

November 28, 2017

November 29, 2017

Finals

Draw

5-8 Places

9-16 Places

17-24 Places

Post-tournament team ranking

See also 
2013 Men's World Team Squash Championships
2015 Men's World Team Squash Championships
Squash

References 

Sport in Marseille
World Squash Championships
2017 in squash
2017 in French sport
Squash in France